Jalpaiguri Lok Sabha constituency is one of the 543 parliamentary constituencies in India. The constituency centres on Jalpaiguri in West Bengal. While six assembly segments of No. 3 Jalpaiguri Lok Sabha constituency are in Jalpaiguri district, one assembly segment is in Cooch Behar district.  The constituency has reserved for Scheduled castes (SC) since 2009.

Assembly segments

As per order of the Delimitation Commission in respect of the delimitation of constituencies in the West Bengal, parliamentary constituency no. 3 Jalpaiguri, reserved for Scheduled castes (SC), is composed of the following segments from 2009:

Members of the Parliament

Election results

General election 2019

General election 2014

General election 2009

General elections 1962-2004
Most of the contests were multi-cornered. However, only winners and runners-up are mentioned below:

References

See also
 List of Lok Sabha constituencies in West Bengal

Gorkhaland
Lok Sabha constituencies in West Bengal
Politics of Jalpaiguri district
Constituencies established in 1962
1962 establishments in West Bengal